GUW may refer to:
 Atyrau Airport, in Kazakhstan
 Golf Union of Wales
 Gun language